Frederick Sheppard "Fred" Grimwade (12 September 1933 – 23 February 1989) was an Australian politician.

Grimwade was born in Melbourne, the son of Erick Grimwade (whose grandfather was a state politician) and Gwendolen Ada Carnegie. He attended Melbourne Grammar School and Melbourne University, where he was a resident student at Trinity College. He graduated with a Bachelor of Agricultural Science, and then undertook further study at Iowa State College in the United States. He subsequently farmed at Glenaroua Homestead in Broadford. On 3 May 1956 he married Joan Elizabeth Rich, State Commissioner of the Victorian Girl Guides Association from 1973 to 1978. Grimwade was involved in several beef farming societies as well as the agriculture faculty of Melbourne University, and was on the council of the Bendigo Institute of Technology and the state Liberal Party. He was a member of Pyalong Shire Council from 1961 to 1980, serving as president from 1962 to 1963 and 1972 to 1972. In 1967 he was elected to the Victorian Legislative Council representing Bendigo Province, transferring to Central Highlands in 1979. He served as President of the Victorian Legislative Council from 1979 to 1985. He retired from politics in 1987.

Grimwade initiated the idea of creating a portrait gallery for former Premiers of Victoria, with Grimwade arranging for paintings to be commissioned from photographs of former non-living Premiers and life studies of living former Premiers. Originally displayed in the corridor leading to the Members Dining Room, the portrait gallery is now located in Queens Hall in Parliament House.

References

1933 births
1989 deaths
Liberal Party of Australia members of the Parliament of Victoria
Members of the Victorian Legislative Council
University of Melbourne alumni
People educated at Trinity College (University of Melbourne)
Iowa State University alumni
Politicians from Melbourne
20th-century Australian politicians